Robertson's Hams is a food company in the United States that was founded in 1946 by V.B. "Tup" Robertson in Marietta, Oklahoma. Robertson's Hams first opened in downtown Marietta and later located their main plant near I-35 in Marietta. Robertson's is known for its sugar-cured and hickory smoked line of meat products. The family owned meat business has franchise locations throughout Texas and Oklahoma.

Products 

 Real Beef Jerky
 Smoked Hams
 Smoked Sausage
 Smoked bacon
 Smoked Cheese
 Smoked Turkeys

Locations 
I-35 at Marietta, OK;
I-20, Exit 307 at Baird, TX;
I-35 at Salado, TX;
I-20 at Wills Point, TX;
I-40 North of Seminole, OK

External links 

 Say goodbye to summer with drives to small-town wonders (post-gazette.com)

Food and drink companies of the United States